Here is the seventh Japanese single by South Korean girl group The Grace, collaboration with Japanese Hip-hop group Cliff Edge under the Rhythm Zone and was released in both CD and CD+DVD (Limited Edition) versions.

"Here" was chosen to be the theme song of drama and movie of "Homeless School Student (Homeless Chugakusei). The movie, starred by Koike Teppei was based on a Japanese best-seller book of the same title which sold 2.2 million copies within two months. The song was set to be the first song in history to be used by both drama and movie.

After the early released of "Here" PV, it was announced that the B-track of "Here", "Near" will also have a promotional video as well. Tenjochiki had been reported to film in Guam for this promotional video.

On September 27, The Grace were the surprise guests at the first screening of "Homeless Chugakusei". They performed "Here" live with Cliff Edge. The Japanese audience known for its meticulous taste in music and performances rose to its feet for a standing ovation in recognition of their superb performance. "Here" was at the top of the pre-order charts and ranked in the Top 20 of J-Pop Usen chart in August and September.

On October 18, four days before the release of "Here", The Grace made another unannounced surprise appearance at the 21st International Tokyo Film Festival. The girls were reported to accompany the author and actors of Homeless Chugakusei.

"Here" released on October 22. It was offered for free download for a limited time two months before release. The Grace and Cliff Edge held a special showcase on July 18 at Tokyo's Shinjuku Face.

"Here" had been promoted the heaviest among Tenjochiki's single. All the promotions helped them achieve what they had never reached before—a rank at #18 on Japan's formidable Oricon Weekly Chart. "Here" had debuted at #12 on the Oricon Daily Chart and kept fluctuating between #12 and #24 the entire week. It never went under #29 until two weeks later, showing the lasting power of the sales. The single charted for five weeks and sold a total of 16,076 copies in Japan, making it The Grace's most successful Japanese release yet in their career.

Track listing

CD Only
  "Here
  "Near: Thoughtful 1220
  "Here (instrumental)
  "Near: Thoughtful 1220 (instrumental)

CD+DVD

CD Portion
  "Here
  "Near: Thoughtful 1220
  "Here (instrumental)
  "Near: Thoughtful 1220 (instrumental)

DVD Portion
  "Here (Video clip)
  "Near: Thoughtful 1220 (Video clip)
  "Here (Video clip off shot)

External links
  Official Website
 Official Archive

2008 singles
2008 songs
Rhythm Zone singles
Song articles with missing songwriters
The Grace (band) songs